Dilacra is a genus of beetles belonging to the family Staphylinidae.

The species of this genus are found in Europe and Northern America.

Species:
 Dilacra cauta (Casey, 1911) 
 Dilacra deserticola Casey

References

Staphylinidae
Staphylinidae genera